The Subaru R1 is a kei car manufactured by the Japanese carmaker Subaru from 2005 to 2010.

Design
Entering production on January 4, 2005, the R1 is a two-door version of the Subaru R2, but with a shorter body and wheelbase. The R1 is unusual in that it does not use up the maximum length allowed for by the kei car regulations—the only other kei cars to have done this since the 1989 Autozam Carol were the Suzuki Twin, Daihatsu Midget, Toyota C+pod, and the European Smart Fortwo.

The R1 was only available in one spec level up to the end of 2005, using a 658 cc Subaru EN engine. The R1 is being marketed as a personal car and as a middle-aged couple's second car; a combination of leather and Alcantara seating is available. All R1s are equipped with a CVT, and all trim levels are available with front-wheel drive as well as four-wheel drive.

In its promotional materials, the R1 was frequently compared to the Subaru 360, the first production Subaru automobile.

Derivative vehicles 
The R1 is the base car for the following vehicles:
The Subaru R1e, an experimental battery electric vehicle undergoing limited production for selected industrial clients in Japan. There was intense interest in this vehicle within the US EV community, as it uses lithium-ion batteries (which contribute to a significant improvement in range and can be 80% recharged in just 15 minutes).
The Prodrive P2 concept sports car.

Collectibles
Tomica manufactured a diecast 1/56 R1 in 2005 as No. 111, and Takara made a Choro-Q plastic pull-back R1.

References

R1
Kei cars
Front-wheel-drive vehicles
All-wheel-drive vehicles
Vehicles with CVT transmission
Cars introduced in 2005
2010s cars